Manitowoc is a city in and the county seat of Manitowoc County, Wisconsin, United States. The city is located on Lake Michigan at the mouth of the Manitowoc River. According to the 2020 census, Manitowoc had a population of 34,626, with over 50,000 residents in the surrounding communities.

History
Purported to mean dwelling of the great spirit, Manitowoc derived its name from either the Ojibwe word manidoowaak(wag), meaning spirit-spawn(s), or manidoowaak(oog), meaning spirit-wood(s), or manidoowak(iin), meaning spirit-land(s). In the Menominee language, it is called Manetōwak, which means "place of the spirits". The Menominee ceded this land to the United States in the 1836 Treaty of the Cedars, following years of negotiations over how to accommodate the Oneida, Stockbridge-Munsee, and Brothertown peoples who had been removed from New York to Wisconsin. In 1838, an act of the Territorial Legislature separated Manitowoc County from Brown County, keeping the native name for the region.

The first Europeans in the area were French fur traders who arrived in 1673. The Northwest Fur Company established a trading post in 1795. In 1835, before the transfer of land from the Menominee Nation to the United States, President Andrew Jackson authorized land sales for the region, drawing the interest of land speculators. William Jones and Louis Fizette were the two first recorded buyers on August 3, 1835, with the majority of the land being procured by the Chicago firm Jones, King, & Co. Benjamin Jones, brother of William, took the Wisconsin property as his share and is considered the founder of Manitowoc. Early immigrant groups included Germans, Norwegians, British, Irish, and Canadians. The first school in Manitowoc was held in the Jones warehouse, with S. M. Peake instructing the twelve children of the community. The first religious organization in the county, St. James' Episcopal Church, first met in 1841. Manitowoc was chartered as a village on March 6, 1851 and on March 12, 1870, was incorporated as a city. Manitowoc replaced neighboring Manitowoc Rapids as the county seat of Manitowoc County in 1853. The current Manitowoc County Courthouse was built in the city in 1906.

In 1847, Joseph Edwards built the first schooner in the area, the Citizen, a modest precursor to the shipbuilding industry that produced schooners and clippers used for fishing and trading in the Great Lakes and beyond the St. Lawrence River. In addition, landing craft, tankers and submarines became the local contributions to U.S. efforts in World War II.

On September 5, 1962, a  piece of the seven-ton Sputnik 4 crashed on North 8th Street. Sputnik 4 was a USSR satellite, part of the Sputnik program and a test-flight of the Vostok spacecraft that would be used for the first human spaceflight. It was launched on May 15, 1960. A bug in the guidance system had pointed the capsule in the wrong direction, so instead of dropping into the atmosphere the satellite moved into a higher orbit. It re-entered the atmosphere on or about September 5, 1962. A cast was made from the original piece before the Soviets claimed it, and the cast was displayed at the Rahr West Art Museum. A customer in a nearby art gallery jokingly suggested that the city should hold a festival to celebrate the crash. The city held the first Sputnikfest in 2008, which was organized by the head of both museums.

Manitowoc was historically a sundown town that prohibited African Americans from staying overnight. In 1968, the policy forced a visiting Gwendolyn Brooks to stay at Holy Family College, just outside of Manitowoc, after a poetry reading.

Manitowoc is home to the Wisconsin Maritime Museum, and is one endpoint of the ferry route of the SS Badger, which connects U.S. Route 10 to Ludington, Michigan.

Since the late 1990s, several new shopping centers have opened in the city, mostly on the southwest side of the city along Interstate 43, including the new Harbor Town Center shopping complex. The downtown area has also seen a resurgence, with several new restaurants opening, and the recent announcement of new $100,000+ condominiums on the Manitowoc River, along with a completion of the riverwalk trail. The bulk of the redevelopment in the city has been undertaken by the public/private partnership the Manitowoc County Economic Development Corporation.

In December 2022, Manitowoc was designated Wisconsin's World War II Heritage City by the US National Park Service.

Geography

Together with Two Rivers and the surrounding towns, the Manitowoc micropolitan area was, according to the 2000 census, home to 52,197 people. The city forms the core of the United States Census Bureau's Manitowoc Micropolitan Statistical Area, which includes all of Manitowoc County (2000 population: 82,887).

Climate
Manitowoc has a humid continental climate. Lake Michigan has a moderating effect on its climate compared to regions more inland, making it warmer in the winter and cooler in the summer than most nearby cities.

Demographics

2020 census 
As of the census of 2020, the population was 34,626. The racial makeup of the city was 82.9% White, 5.0% Asian, 2.4% Black or African American, 0.7% Native American, 2.6% from other races, and 6.4% from two or more races. Ethnically, the population was 7.2% Hispanic or Latino of any race.

2010 census 
As of the census of 2010, there were 33,736 people, 14,623 households, and 8,600 families residing in the city. The racial makeup of the city was 89.9% White, 1.0% African American, 0.6% Native American, 4.6% Asian, 2.1% from other races, and 1.9% from two or more races. Hispanic or Latino of any race were 5.0% of the population.

There were 14,623 households, of which 27.0% had children under the age of 18 living with them, 44.5% were married couples living together, 10.0% had a female householder with no husband present, 4.3% had a male householder with no wife present, and 41.2% were non-families. 35.4% of all households were made up of individuals, and 14.7% had someone living alone who was 65 years of age or older. The average household size was 2.24 and the average family size was 2.91.

The median age in the city was 41.7 years. 22.2% of residents were under the age of 18; 8.1% were between the ages of 18 and 24; 23.7% were from 25 to 44; 27.2% were from 45 to 64; and 18.8% were 65 years of age or older. The gender makeup of the city was 48.2% male and 51.8% female.

2000 census
As of the census of 2000, there were 34,053 people, 14,235 households, and 8,811 families residing in the city. The population density was 2,018.8 people per square mile (779.4/km2). There were 15,007 housing units at an average density of 889.7 per square mile (343.5/km2). The racial makeup of the city was 93.13% White, 0.59% Black or African American, 0.55% Native American, 3.77% Asian, 0.07% Pacific Islander, 0.90% from other races, and 0.99% from two or more races. 2.52% of the population were Hispanic or Latino of any race.

There were 14,235 households, out of which 28.6% had children under the age of 18 living with them, 49.0% were married couples living together, 9.1% had a female householder with no husband present, and 38.1% were non-families. 32.5% of all households were made up of individuals, and 14.6% had someone living alone who was 65 years of age or older. The average household size was 2.32 and the average family size was 2.96.

In the city, the population was spread out, with 24.1% under the age of 18, 8.2% from 18 to 24, 27.9% from 25 to 44, 21.4% from 45 to 64, and 18.4% who were 65 years of age or older. The median age was 39 years. For every 100 females, there were 93.9 males. For every 100 females age 18 and over, there were 90.9 males.

The median income for a household in the city was $38,203, and the median income for a family was $47,635. Males had a median income of $35,176 versus $22,918 for females. The per capita income for the city was $19,954. About 5.0% of families and 7.9% of the population were below the poverty line, including 11.7% of those under age 18 and 7.5% of those age 65 or over.

Government

The city government consists of a mayor and a city council with 10 members elected from single member districts. The current mayor is Justin Nickels.

Business and industry

 The Manitowoc Company, founded in Manitowoc but now headquartered in Milwaukee, grew out of the shipbuilding industry. It is a diversified manufacturer with interests in the construction and food service industries. The acquisition of Grove Crane resulted in the relocation of crane manufacturing to Shady Grove, Pennsylvania, ending its crane manufacturing operations in Manitowoc.
 The city is the world headquarters of Lakeside Foods Company, and Bio-Blend Fuels.
 Burger Boat Company, a yacht builder is located in Manitowoc and produces approximately 2–3 yachts each year.
 Baileigh Industrial, a manufacturer of metal fabrication and woodworking machines.
 Orion Energy Systems, specializing in energy-efficient commercial fluorescent and solar lighting.

Health care

The Manitowoc area is served by two main medical groups:
 Holy Family Memorial with an inpatient medical center including an emergency room, a Cancer Care Center as part of the Regional Cancer Collaborative made up of nine regional hospitals fighting cancer in northeast Wisconsin, a Heart and Vascular Center, regional orthopaedic services, retail pharmacies, a home medical supply retail store, medically based wellness center, state of the art rehab facility, and more than 15 clinics in the county.
 Aurora Health Care with one main campus in Two Rivers, and several dozen health clinics throughout the county.

Education

Manitowoc public schools are administered by the Manitowoc Public School District. High schools within the city include:
 
 Lincoln High School
 Roncalli High School
Manitowoc Lutheran High School

Colleges 
The city has two colleges and universities within its limits: the University of Wisconsin–Manitowoc and Lakeshore Technical College. Holy Family College closed in 2020.

Media

Newspapers

 Manitowoc Herald Times Reporter—Daily newspaper owned by Gannett Newspapers.
 Lakeshore Chronicle—Printed on Sundays and Wednesdays only. Also owned by Gannett Newspapers.

Television and radio

Manitowoc is part of the Green Bay television market, although it is not uncommon for residents to receive stations over-the-air from Milwaukee, and across the lake from the Grand Rapids and Traverse City/Cadillac markets. No television stations originate from Manitowoc, and the only full-time presence of Green Bay stations in the city are remote-operated weather cameras and WFRV-TV featuring some Herald Times Reporter content in newscasts as part of a promotional agreement with Gannett's northeastern Wisconsin newspapers.

Comcast holds the city's cable franchise, inherited from the company's earlier purchase of Jones Intercable, and the city has the only presence of Comcast or Xfinity in the state of Wisconsin.

Manitowoc is classed as part of Nielsen Audio's Sheboygan/Manitowoc radio market and combined with Two Rivers, and stations from both Sheboygan and Green Bay are easily heard in the area. Since 2017, Seehafer Broadcasting has owned all six commercial radio stations broadcasting towards and licensed to Manitowoc and Two Rivers (several other stations are licensed to Manitowoc County communities, but they all instead target Green Bay and the Fox Cities).

Fictional characters

Phil Coulson of the Marvel Cinematic Universe stated he was born there in the thirteenth episode of the second season of the television show Agents of S.H.I.E.L.D.

Paige Morgan in the movie The Prince & Me is from Manitowoc.

Religion
The Franciscan Sisters of Christian Charity have their mother house in Manitowoc.

In 2005 the Roman Catholic Diocese of Green Bay merged several Catholic parishes in the city into one parish, St. Francis of Assisi Catholic Church, with a 4-man pastoral team led by Father Dan Felton. In 2005, the Herald Times Reporter reported that the city has roughly 22,000 Roman Catholics.

The Wisconsin Evangelical Lutheran Synod is a significant Christian synod in the city with four large churches and Manitowoc Lutheran High School. Two additional Wisconsin Synod churches are outside the city limits with a Manitowoc address.

St. James' is an historic Episcopal church in the city.

The Church of Jesus Christ of Latter-day Saints has a meetinghouse in Manitowoc.

Points of interest

 The Rahr West Art Museum is housed in a 19th-century mansion near downtown Manitowoc. Donated by the Rahr family in 1941 for use as a community civic art center, it has been since expanded numerous times. The Museum currently houses art ranging from the 15th–21st centuries, with paintings, sculptures, and a preserved Victorian home in its possession.

 The Wisconsin Maritime Museum was founded in 1970 as the Manitowoc Submarine Memorial Association, and has since grown to be one of the largest nautical museums in the country; it has recently been granted affiliation status with the Smithsonian. Perhaps the Museum's crown jewel however is the World War II era USS Cobia, an authentic combat submarine similar to those built in Manitowoc during the war. There are daily tours of the vessel, which is moored in Manitowoc's harbor, allowing visitors a look at Manitowoc's role in the war and building 28 submarines for the U.S. Navy.
 The Lincoln Park Zoo is a year-round zoo and is part of the Manitowoc Parks and Recreation Department. The Lincoln Park Zoo has tours and educational programs available for small and large groups.
 The Eighth Street Historic District encompasses the city's historic downtown and includes many buildings from the 1850s-1930s, including the beaux-arts style Manitowoc County Courthouse.

Transportation

Public transportation in the city been provided by Maritime Metro Transit since 1978, covering both Manitowoc and Two Rivers, Wisconsin. MMT currently has a fleet of 12 buses serving over 40 stops on 8 routes.

Manitowoc is the western port for the S.S. Badger ferry, that crosses Lake Michigan to Ludington, Michigan. The ferry ride is part of the route of U.S. Route 10.

The Manitowoc Mariners Trail is a  paved recreational trail running along the shore of Lake Michigan between the cities of Manitowoc and Two Rivers, Wisconsin.

Highways
 northbound connects to Green Bay and southbound connects to Sheboygan, Milwaukee, and Beloit.
 travels east across Lake Michigan via the SS Badger to Ludington, Michigan, and west to Appleton.
 southbound connects to Chilton and Fond Du Lac.
 travels southward to Howards Grove and Sheboygan and northward to Sturgeon Bay, Two Rivers and Kewaunee.

Airport
Manitowoc County Airport (KMTW) serves the city and surrounding communities.

Notable people 

 James Sibree Anderson, Wisconsin State Representative
 George W. Barker, U.S. Marshal for Vermont, Judge of Maniwitoc County, Wisconsin
 Henry Baetz, Treasurer of Wisconsin
 John A. Bentley, Wisconsin State Senator
 Garey Bies, Wisconsin State Representative, born in Manitowoc 
 Dale Bolle, Wisconsin State Representative
 Guila Bustabo, violinist, born in Manitowoc
 Matt Christman, co-host of Chapo Trap House
 Gerald W. Clusen, U.S. Navy admiral 
 Charles Daellenbach, musician, founder of Grammy Award-winning Canadian Brass, graduate of Lincoln High School
 Benjamin W. Diederich, Wisconsin State Representative
 E. H. Ellis, former mayor of Green Bay, Wisconsin
 Charles E. Estabrook, Wisconsin Attorney General
 Peter Fanta, U.S. Navy admiral
 Amy Fote, principal dancer with Houston ballet, born and raised in Manitowoc
 Doug Free, offensive lineman for NFL Dallas Cowboys, 2002 graduate of Lincoln High
 Raymond Gorte, Member of the National Academy of Engineering
 Romy Gosz, Popular Midwest Polka Musician, Inducted in the International Polka Hall of Fame and Wisconsin Polka Hall of Fame
 Carl Hansen, Wisconsin State Representative
 Donald K. Helgeson, Wisconsin State Representative
 William H. Hemschemeyer, Wisconsin State Representative
 Solomon S. Huebner, college professor
 Peter Johnston, Wisconsin State Representative
 Edgar A. Jonas, U.S. Representative from Illinois
 M. W. Kalaher, Wisconsin State Representative
 Eugene S. Kaufman, Wisconsin State Representative
 Norman Knudson, Wisconsin State Senator
 Erik Kowalski, Musician
 Ardis Krainik, opera singer (1928–1997)
 Francis J. Lallensack, Wisconsin State Representative
 Lawrence W. Ledvina, Wisconsin State Representative and lawyer
 Frederic Ives Lord, airman (Spanish Civil War)
 Stoney McGlynn, MLB player
 Andrew Miller, Medal of Honor recipient
 Robert Naumann, Wisconsin State Representative
 Garth Neustadter, Emmy Award-winning composer and multi-instrumentalist
 William Henry Phipps, Wisconsin State Senator
 Franz Pieper, President of Lutheran Church–Missouri Synod
 Reinhardt Rahr, Wisconsin State Representative
 Alexander W. Randall, 1886–1889 Postmaster General of United States
 Samuel W. Randolph, Wisconsin State Senator
 Joseph Rankin, U.S. Representative 1883–1886
 Karl L. Rankin, U.S. diplomat
 Paula J. Raschke-Lind, Illinois State Representative
 George Reed, politician
 Angus B. Rothwell, Superintendent of Public Instruction
 Charles Eberhard Salomon, Union Army general
 Frederick Salomon, Union Army general
 Henry Schadeberg, U.S. Representative
 Emil P. Scheibe, Wisconsin State Representative
 Raymond J. Scheuer, Wisconsin State Assembyman
 Carl Schmidt, Wisconsin State Senator
 Charles Schuette, Wisconsin State Representative
 John Schuette, Wisconsin State Senator
 William L. Schultz, circus performer, teacher, writer
 Wilbur Schwandt, songwriter, "Dream a Little Dream of Me"
 Reuben D. Smart, Wisconsin State Representative
 Thorvald Solberg (1852–1949), first Register of Copyrights in United States Copyright Office
 Merta Sterling, actress
 Sheri Swokowski, Army officer and transgender rights activist
 Robert Tills, United States Navy, killed in Philippines during World War II
 Susan Bowers Vergeront, Wisconsin State Representative
 Joseph Vilas, Wisconsin State Senator
 Henry Vits, Wisconsin State Representative
 Otto A. Vogel, Wisconsin State Representative
 R. T. Wallen, artist, born in Manitowoc and attended Lincoln High School
 Pat Willis, judge, born in Manitowoc
 Joseph Willott, Jr., Wisconsin State Representative
 Walter Wittman, Wisconsin State Representative
 Francis A. Yindra, Wisconsin State Senator
 Bob Ziegelbauer, Wisconsin State Representative and current County Executive

Sister city
Manitowoc has one sister city:
  Kamogawa, Japan

References

External links

 City of Manitowoc
 Manitowoc Area Visitor & Convention Bureau
 Manitowoc Local History Collection at the University of Wisconsin Digital Collections

Cities in Wisconsin
Cities in Manitowoc County, Wisconsin
Micropolitan areas of Wisconsin
Wisconsin populated places on Lake Michigan
County seats in Wisconsin
Populated places established in the 1830s
Inland port cities and towns in Wisconsin
World War II Heritage Cities